Éric Lada (born October 14, 1965 in Chartres) is a retired French professional football player.

1965 births
Living people
French footballers
FC Sochaux-Montbéliard players
Nîmes Olympique players
Olympique de Marseille players
Toulouse FC players
Olympique Noisy-le-Sec players
US Marseille Endoume players
Association football forwards